Fort Avenue may refer to:

 Fort Avenue (Baltimore), Maryland, United States
 Fort Avenue Line, CityLink Navy, BaltimoreLink; an electrified overhead line for electric trolleybus service on Fort Avenue, Baltimore, Maryland, United States
 Fort Avenue, Salem, Massachusetts, United States
 U.S. Route 460 Business (Lynchburg, Virginia), United States; known as "Fort Avenue"

See also

 Fortified gateway, a fort on an avenue for controlling passage on the avenue
 
 Avenue (disambiguation)
 Fort (disambiguation)
 Fort Road (disambiguation)
 Fort Street (disambiguation)